SecurityScorecard is an information security company that rates cybersecurity postures of corporate entities through completing scored analysis of cyber threat intelligence signals for the purposes of third party management and IT risk management. The company is based in New York City, New York, United States.

History 
SecurityScorecard was founded in 2014 by CEO Aleksandr Yampolskiy and COO Sam Kassoumeh. Shortly thereafter, Alexander Heid joined the team as Chief Research Officer.

Awards 
In 2020, SecurityScorecard was named as a Technology Pioneer by World Economic Forum.

See also 
 Enterprise Risk Management
 Supplier Risk Management

References

External links 
Official SecurityScorecard website

Security companies of the United States
Computer security companies
Companies based in New York City
Technology companies established in 2013